It Happened at the Police Station is a 1963 Soviet drama film directed by Villen Azarov.

Plot 
The film tells about the police named Nikolai Sazonov, who is trying to find a man who disappeared during the siege of Leningrad.

Cast 
 Vsevolod Sanaev
 Mark Bernes
 Vyacheslav Nevinnyy
 Aleksandr Belyavskiy
 Oleg Golubitsky
 Zoya Fyodorova
 Sergey Nikonenko
 Lidiya Smirnova
 Mikhail Ulyanov
 Gennadiy Yukhtin

References

External links 
 

1963 films
1960s Russian-language films
Soviet drama films
1963 drama films